Maat Pitaah Ke Charnon Mein Swarg (English: There's Heaven In The Foots Of Parents)  is an Indian television series based on the concept of love, emotion, and respect among children and parents. The series premiered on Colors on 29 June 2009, and is produced by Rajan Shahi. This follows the story of Shubh, who faces many ups and downs in his life but always tries to obey and serve his parents. It was dubbed in Telugu as Swargam on Gemini TV. A Porsche car cost ₹17.5 crore was used in a sequence.

Plot

Shubh, the only son of Kamla and Satyanarayan Tripathi, is a bright and affectionate boy. He is disabled and needs an operation on one of his legs. However, Kamla dies in a stampede while trying to raise enough money to pay for Shubh's operation. Satyanarayan gets remarried to Yashoda, who is very fond of Shubh. Even though the Tripathi family is able to raise enough money, doctors reveal that it is too late for Shubh's operation.

Shubh grows up into a mature and responsible young man. He dotes on his younger half brothers - Arjun and Ansh. Being disabled, Shubh has to face many insults and disappointments but remains unwavering in his devotion to God and to his parents. Satyanarayan especially trusts Shubh. Arjun marries Lolita and Shubh marries Suhani. Arjun and Lolita start poisoning Yashoda's mind against Shubh and Suhani. As a result, Yashoda's love for Shubh begins to waver. This leads to a series of complications with Shubh and Suhani leaving the Tripathi house, Suhani vanishing, and being found but with a changed appearance, and Arjun taking over the control of the household with Lolita's help.

In the end, all gets well, though the Tripathi family suffers some irreversible losses in the process.

Cast 
Pracheen Chauhan as Shubh
Archana Taide/ Megha Gupta as Suhani 
Yatin Karyekar as Satyanarayan, Shubh's father
Pooja Madaan as Kamla, Satyanarayan's first wife and Shubh's biological mother
Jyoti Gauba as Yashoda, Satyanarayan's second wife
Reyaansh Vir Chaddha as Arjun, Yashoda and Satyanarayan's elder son
Dheeraj Dhoopar as Ansh, Yashoda and Satyanarayan's younger son
Shamin Mannan as Lolita, Arjun's wife
Amardeep Jha as Mehru Chachi, grandmotherly figure for Shubh
Avinash Wadhawan as Kalishwer
Vinny Arora as Gayatri
Reshma Modi as Manorama, Satyanarayan's sister
Rajendra Chawla as Chandar, Manorama's husband
Shilpa Shinde as Astha, Suhani's elder sister
Sunil Jaitley as Tilluram, Gayatri's father
Geeta Tyagi as Jhini, Gayatri's mother
Riddhi Dogra as Payal, Suhani's childhood friend

References

External links
Maat Pitaah Ke Charnon Mein Swarg News Articles on Tellychakkar.com

Colors TV original programming
Indian drama television series
2009 Indian television series debuts
2010 Indian television series endings